Naamah or Na'amah can refer to:

Religion 
 Naamah (Genesis), the daughter of Lamech the Cainite
 Naamah, Noah's wife in some extra-Biblical traditions
 Naamah (wife of Solomon), mother of Rehoboam
 Naamah, a city of Canaan, listed in Joshua as having been conquered and subsequently settled by the Tribe of Judah
 Naamah (demon), one of the demonic wives of the archangel Samael in the Zohar
 Naamah Kelman (born 1955), American-born Rabbi, Dean of the Hebrew Union College-Jewish Institute of Religion campus in Jerusalem

Music 
 "Dark Princess Naamah" and "Invocation of Naamah", songs from Swedish symphonic metal band Therion
 Nahemah (band), a Spanish progressive death metal band

Literature 
 Naamah, one of the Companions of Elua in Jacqueline Carey's Kushiel's Legacy saga
 Naamah, an antagonist in the Dragons In Our Midst series by Bryan Davis (author)
 Naamah Darling, Andan Cly's airship in the Clockwork Century books by Cherie Priest

Gaming 
 Naamah, a changeling girl in the roleplay game Changeling: the Lost
 Naamah, a Manei Domini agent of the Word of Blake in the tabletop war game BattleTech
 Naamah the Soul-Eater, boss of the Sanctum Of Destruction hero map on Grand Chase

See also
Naama (disambiguation)

ru:Ноема